Rabbi Shalom Dov Wolpo, also Sholom Ber Wolpe, (born 1948) is a rabbi and an Israeli political activist. Wolpo is the author of more than forty books.

He has become associated in recent years with right-wing political causes, and has set up a campaign group—SOS Israel—an organization that runs press and billboard campaigns promoting the belief that surrender of parts of the Land of Israel is prohibited by halacha. Later, in 2008, Wolpo established an additional group opposing land concessions, Our Land of Israel.

He also has called for an independent country called the State of Judea be established in the West Bank. According to J. J. Goldberg, he has raised funds to assist families of Jewish terrorists and called for courts to pass a sentence with a death penalty on a number of Israeli politicians such as Ehud Olmert, Ehud Barak, and Tzipi Livni.

Chabad messianism 

Rabbi Wolpo is one of the leaders of the group of Chabad Chasidim believing that the late Lubavitcher Rebbe, Rabbi Menachem Mendel Schneerson, is the messiah. He was one of the first to openly describe Rabbi Schneerson as the Messiah. In 1984, he wrote a book proclaiming the Rebbe as the Moshiach. However, after a public address by Rabbi Schneerson in which he said that "such a book can cause hundreds of Jews to stop learning Chassidus, and oppose the Baal Shem Tov and his teachings", he did not publish the book. The book was later published in 1991 with Rabbi Schneerson's blessings.

In an interview with Israeli Channel 2 evening news in March 1994, Wolpo told an interviewer that Rabbi Schneerson's place as the Messiah and the fact of his "eternal life" was "as secure as the rising of the sun in the morning".

He wrote a number of books of critique on the writings of Elazar Man Shach, leader of Lithuanian Haredim — a prominent opponent of the Chabad-Lubavitch movement and of Rabbi Schneerson himself — under the title Yedaber Shalom.

Politics 
In 1979, on the instructions of the Lubavitcher Rebbe, he published his first book Da'at Torah, a polemic against returning lands captured by Israel. He was active in the protests that surrounded the forced eviction of Yamit, as per the Rebbe's instructions to him, and in 1982, he published the book Shalom, Shalom, Ve'ain Shalom that argued that peace with Arabs was impossible, and no discussions concerning concessions may be held.

Gaza disengagement 
He was active in the protest movement in 2005 that fought the disengagement from Gaza. Following the failure of that campaign, he organized a rabbinical conference entitled "We shall never forget, and we shall never forgive". After the Second Lebanon War, Wolpo organized a publicity campaign with the slogan "We Told You So" that distributed over a million brochures. He was also responsible for a poster campaign promising that those responsible for Israel's actions during the war would be "punished from Heaven".

In January 2006, he wrote a letter to Olmert warning him that if he ever gave up even a "tiny parcel" of the Land of Israel, he would suffer from a bitter fate. The letter noted that Rabbi Schneerson had warned that he would personally fight with all his powers against any Prime Minister who gave up Israeli territory or backpedaled over settlements. He told the press that Ariel Sharon had brought about a "new holocaust" with the Gaza disengagement, and that he had gladly "collaborated with the Nazis of today". He ruled that assisting in the evacuation of the Gaza settlement was as bad as violating the Jewish Sabbath. He called for Olmert to be "brought to trial and punished".

Following the disengagement, he published a book entitled "Between Light and Dark", in which he shows that Rabbi Schneerson was right about rejecting Zionism and the claim of religious Zionists that the founding of the State is the "beginning of the redemption".

SOS Israel 
He is the founder of the organization Ha'Matteh L'Hatzolat Ha'Am V'Ha'Aretz—SOS Israel—a grass-roots action group that unites a broad spectrum of the religious right in Israel behind extensive poster campaigns and mass protests against giving parts of the Holy Land away to Israel's enemies.

Another campaign run by his organization, under the slogan "There is Judgement, and there is a Judge" (referring to God), has generated considerable controversy in the Israeli press in March 2007. One radio host, Natan Zahavi, denounced Wolpo on the radio in obscene terms, and the Israeli Broadcasting Authority is currently investigating.

He has recently released a film under the SOS Israel name entitled "There is judgement, and there is a judge", which shows how all the political leaders that had a hand in the Gaza disengagement have suffered as a result - for example, Sharon suffered a stroke; former Chief of Staff Dan Halutz and Police Chief Moshe Karadi were forced to resign; President Moshe Katsav, former Minister Chaim Ramon, and MK Tzachi Hanegbi have been involved in criminal affairs; and Yonatan Bassi, head of the Disengagement Administration, had to leave his kibbutz after being accused of collaborating in driving settlers out of their homes. The film maintains that this is God's retribution. The film includes footage of Rabbi Schneerson declaring that making territorial concessions to the Arabs will lead to disaster and telling Katzav that "it would lead to the opposite of peace". Maariv reports that two million copies of the film are to be distributed, and the film is to be made available for download online.

Recent activities

New political party 
On 11 November 2008, Wolpo founded a new party, Eretz Yisrael Shelanu. The party allied itself with the Jewish National Front, and ran in the 2009 Knesset elections as part of the National Union alliance. Eretz Yisrael Shelanu took one of the party's four seats, taken by Michael Ben-Ari.

Textbooks 
In a Halachic ruling, Wolpo ruled that it was forbidden to teach children from Israeli education ministry-approved textbooks that show maps of Israel with Green Line marked, as this was an attack on West Bank settlers. He told Maariv that Israeli education minister Yuli Tamir should "recall what happened to Ariel Sharon" before she attacked the settlement movement.

Controversial slogan 
In February 2007, Wolpo appealed a decision that a political campaign under the slogan "If anyone comes to remove me from my home, I will chop off their hands" amounted to incitement to violence, since retired Supreme Court Justice Mishael Cheshin vowed to defend the Supreme Court, which he said was dear to him, with all his strength, saying, "If someone raises a hand against my house, I will cut it off", and he wasn't accused of anything. The slogan was meant to protest the removal of Jewish settlers from their West Bank homes.

Hananel Dayan 
Wolpo arranged an elaborate award ceremony for Sergeant Hananel Dayan (son of Yosef Dayan), who was disciplined for refusing to shake the hand of Israeli Chief of Staff Dan Halutz. The soldier was protesting the forced eviction of his grandparents from their Gaza home in 2005.

Rabbi David Druckman 
In 2006, Wolpo defended Rabbi David Drukman, chief rabbi of Kiryat Motzkin, over charges that he had abused his position as a state employee to incite violence. Wolpo said: "Rabbi Drukman will go down in history as someone who stood up to a vile government fearlessly."

Second Lebanon War 
During the 2006 Second Lebanon War, he told the local Kiryat Gat weekly that, "Olmert has declared war against God and against His Torah", and that he should be brought to justice. He added that the war should continue "until the enemy has been totally eradicated".

Anti-Zionism 
In 2006, offered a free copy of one of his book "From Light to Darkness" to anyone that pledged to refrain from celebrating Independence Day.

In 2007, he told a conference in Jerusalem that "the remedy for the disengagement is to understand that the State of Israel is a terrible thing. We should not bless or praise the state that was founded by criminals and heretics like Herzl."

Olmert hanging comments 
In December 2007, Wolpo stated that his followers will secede from Israel if the Israeli government withdraws from the West Bank. It is unclear which part of Israel Wolpo and his followers would claim, or how they would achieve autonomous status.

Wolpo, addressing a demonstration against the Olmert government's peace moves with the Palestinian Authority, said that the prime minister, Vice Premier Chaim Ramon, Foreign Minister Tzipi Livni, and Defense Minister Ehud Barak would be "hung from the gallows", were Israel run properly.

"The terrible traitor, Ehud Olmert, who gives these Nazis weapons, who gives money, who frees their murderous terrorists, this man, like Ariel Sharon, collaborates with the Nazis", Wolpo said in the speech.

Yoel Hasson, a lawmaker with Olmert's Kadima party, said he would ask Israel's attorney general to take legal steps against Wolpo. The U.S.-based Orthodox Union issued a statement condemning the remarks.

Rabbi Wolpo said that the comments he made at the conference were twisted and taken out of context. In calling for the execution of state leaders by legal means, he was not calling for vigilante violence, he explained, but rather calling on the police to implement the law. Rabbi Wolpo wrote that he believes violence against a fellow Jew is unacceptable, but that law enforcement has the right and responsibility to enforce the law.

One of Israel's laws prohibits providing assistance to Nazis, he explained, and Muslim terrorist groups are the Nazis of our day. If the government provides terrorists with aid, he reasoned, then the government has violated the law, and its members must suffer the consequences, which can include the death penalty.

Rabbi Wolpo emphasized that he was calling for any such punishments to be carried out in a legal manner.

Bibliography 
Wolpo has published over 40 books in Hebrew. These include:
Daat Torah Be'inyanei HaMatzav B'Eretz HaKodesh—polemic concerning the halachic prohibition of territorial concessions of parts of the Land of Israel.
Shalom Shalom V'Ein Shalom—proves that everything the Rebbe said, based on Torah sources, about the State of Israel, came true.
Gedolei Yisrael Al Hachzoras Shtachim—Torah leaders on the subject of surrendering parts of The Holy Land.
Yechi HaMelech—polemic arguing that Rabbi Schneerson is the Messiah.
Yechi HaMelech HaMoshiach—explanation of the legal ruling declaring Rabbi Schneerson to be the "Presumed Messiah".
Yedaber Shalom—a series of books disputing the works of Eliezer Schach.
Rodef U'ba Be'machteret—a halachic discussion of the concept of a rodef.
Ki Hem Chayenu—770 Jewish Ideas—educational textbook (Israeli Education Ministry).
Shemen Sasson MeChavreicha—anthology of Torah leaders and their connection with the Lubavitcher Rebbe (three vols.).
Leket Shikchat HaPeah—halachic exegesis on the wearing of wigs by Jewish women, and why they are preferable as a hair covering.
Yakum Se'are Lidmama—more on women's wigs.
Bein Ohr Lechoshech—explains opinion of Rabbi Schneerson that the State of Israel is not the "aschalta di'ge'ula" (beginning of the redemption).
V'Torah Yivakshu Mi'Pihu—it explains various Chabad customs.
Mevaser Tov—explains Chabad's position on various things especially Moshiach.
Ha'Nisayon Ha'Acharon—explains why the Rebbe is Moshiach even after his death 3 Tammuz 5754.
 Pardes Shalom—His scholarly work on the Talmud and Maimonides' Mishneh Torah (two vols.).
U'biarta ha'ra mikerbecha—explains the Talmudic discussion.
Sefer, Sofer, V'sippur—a book attacking the booklet Yisbareru v'yislabnu—by Rabbi Yechezkel Sofer.
Harambam Hashalem—on the laws of Shabbos.
Tumas Yesharim Tanchem—a book in response to the book Bemai Kamifligi—by Rabbi Yechezkel Sofer.

References 

Israeli Hasidim
Hasidic rabbis in Israel
Living people
1948 births